Silverside is a cut of beef from the hindquarter of cattle, just above the leg cut. Called "silverside" in the UK, Ireland, South Africa,  Australia and New Zealand, it gets the name because of the "silverwall" on the side of the cut, a long fibrous "skin" of connective tissue (epimysium) which has to be removed as it is too tough to eat. The primary muscle is the biceps femoris.

Silverside is boned out from the top along with the topside and thick flank. It is usually prepared as a 2nd class roasting joint. It may also be thinly sliced for minute steak or beef olives, or split in two to produce a salmon-cut.

In South Africa, Australia, Ireland and New Zealand, silverside is the cut of choice for corning or brining, so much so that the name "silverside" is often used to refer to corned beef (also called salt beef) rather than any other form of the cut. The common method of preparation is being boiled and left simmering for several hours. With the addition of onions, potatoes and other vegetables this results in a meal that is effectively identical to the New England boiled dinner. 

In South Africa this cut is often used to make biltong (a form of dried, cured meat).

In most parts of the U.S., this cut is known as outside or bottom round, as traditionally, a hindquarter is laid on the cutting table with the outside down or to the bottom, as opposed to the inside being on top. In the U.S. it is also known as a rump roast, which means something different in countries using the British beef cut scheme.

References

Cuts of beef